Clarence A. Boonstra (January 5, 1914 – March 20, 2006) was an American ambassador to Costa Rica. His tours of duty also covered Brazil, Mexico and Philippines.

He was born in Grand Rapids, Michigan. Boonstra received graduation from Michigan State University. He received master's degree from Louisiana State University in economics in 1937 and in 1942 he gained doctorate in agriculture economics. After entering in Foreign service in 1946, he served as deputy chief of mission and chargé d'affaires in Mexico City. He served as political adviser to U.S. military forces with the Southern Command in Panama and also as director for South American affairs in the State Department.

During the rule of Juan Perón, he served in Argentina and in Cuba as guerrilla fighters under Fidel Castro that battled to overthrow the Batista government.

From 1967 to 1969, he served as ambassador to Costa Rica. He took retirement from Foreign service in 1974.

He died of pneumonia on March 20, 2006 at age 92 in Gainesville, Florida.

References

1914 births
2006 deaths
Deaths from pneumonia in Florida
Ambassadors of the United States to Costa Rica
Michigan State University alumni
Louisiana State University alumni